As It Happened is a 2002 novel by the English writer David Storey. It tells the story of an art professor who attends group therapy sessions.

Reception
The Observer'''s Adam Mars-Jones criticised the book's punctuation, loose grammar and unstructured sentences, writing that "no book as unreadable as As It Happened would be published without surgery if it came from an unknown writer - unless all the reading is now done by machines, like so much of the proofreading." D. J. Taylor of The Independent described the prose as "just on the right side of intelligibility", and wrote: "Fascinating in some of its incidentals, never free of the sensation of a sharp intelligence at work, As it happened'' offers in the end only the spectacle of a highly distinguished veteran author enjoying a conversation with that receptive but debilitating audience: himself."

References

2002 British novels
English novels
Novels by David Storey
Jonathan Cape books